Agostinho Odiquir Cá (born 24 July 1993) is a Portuguese professional footballer who plays for Canedo F.C. as a defensive midfielder.

Club career
Born in Bissau, Guinea-Bissau, Cá joined Sporting CP's youth system in 2009, aged 16. In the summer of 2012, after concluding his development, he moved to FC Barcelona in Spain alongside teammate and compatriot Edgar Ié.

In Catalonia, Cá started playing with the B team in the Segunda División. He made his official debut on 31 October 2012, featuring three minutes as a substitute for Javier Espinosa in a 4–1 away win against SD Huesca.

After taking no part for Barça the following season, Cá was loaned to fellow league side Girona FC on 24 January 2014. He played only once for his new team, replacing Juanlu for the final 11 minutes of a 6–0 victory over CD Lugo at the Estadi Montilivi on 16 February.

On 19 August 2015, Cá joined the third Catalan club of his career, being loaned alongside Joel Huertas to Lleida Esportiu from Segunda División B. After appearing in no competitive games during the campaign, his loan was cancelled a month early.

Cá began a trial at Italian Lega Pro side Parma Calcio 1913 in September 2016, but a potential transfer was eventually scuppered by a knee injury. The following 1 April, he signed with FC Stumbras in Lithuania's A Lyga.

In August 2018, Cá returned to his country of adoption and joined LigaPro club C.D. Cova da Piedade. After only two appearances, he left on 18 November for personal reasons.

International career
Cá represented Portugal at the 2012 UEFA European Under-19 Championship, playing three games in an eventual group stage exit.

References

External links

 (2012–2019)
 (2019–present)

1993 births
Living people
Bissau-Guinean emigrants to Portugal
Portuguese sportspeople of Bissau-Guinean descent
Sportspeople from Bissau
Bissau-Guinean footballers
Portuguese footballers
Association football midfielders
Liga Portugal 2 players
Campeonato de Portugal (league) players
Sporting CP footballers
C.D. Cova da Piedade players
G.D. Vitória de Sernache players
Segunda División players
Segunda División B players
FC Barcelona Atlètic players
Girona FC players
Lleida Esportiu footballers
A Lyga players
FC Stumbras players
Lebanese Premier League players
Shabab El Bourj SC players
Portugal youth international footballers
Bissau-Guinean expatriate footballers
Portuguese expatriate footballers
Expatriate footballers in Spain
Expatriate footballers in Lithuania
Expatriate footballers in Lebanon
Portuguese expatriate sportspeople in Spain
Portuguese expatriate sportspeople in Lithuania